Euplexia euplexina is a moth of the family Noctuidae. It is endemic to the Canary Islands, where it is found on La Gomera, La Palma and Tenerife.

Adults are on wing year round, but are rare in summer.

The larvae feed on various ferns, including Dryopteris oligodonta, Pteridium aquilinum and Dryopteris guanchica and herbaceous plants, including Argyranthemum broussonetii and Urtica morifolia. Young larvae are green, becoming browner when older. Pupation takes place in a cocoon in soil litter.

References

External links 
 Images of Euplexia euplexina
 Images of Euplexia euplexina
 Original description of Euplexia euplexina

Euplexia
Moths described in 1957